Charles Richard Plotkin (born September 8, 1942) is a recording engineer and producer, best known for his work with Bruce Springsteen and Bob Dylan.

Recording engineer
Plotkin has recorded, engineered, mastered and produced albums by Bruce Springsteen, Bob Dylan, and many other artists, starting with The Floating House Band in 1972.  Just before hooking up with Springsteen for the mixing of "Darkness On The Edge Of Town", Plotkin produced the critically acclaimed "Cocaine Drain" album by The Cowsills.

Among Plotkin's major achievements as an engineer, according to Springsteen official biographer Dave Marsh, was the mastering of Bruce Springsteen's Nebraska album.  Springsteen recorded the album as a set of demonstration tapes on an inexpensive home cassette recorder.  According to Marsh, the task of turning the raw, unprocessed cassette tape (which had spent weeks in Springsteen's pants pocket) into a professional-sounding vinyl LP was a daunting one, and a major technical accomplishment.

He has been credited as a producer on several Springsteen albums.

Film and record producer
Plotkin was credited as producer for the 1995 movie Mirage  and produced the soundtrack albums for several films including Dead Man Walking, Vietnam, Long Time Coming, Philadelphia, and Jerry Maguire.

Other appearances
Plotkin was also featured in the 1996 documentary Blood Brothers: Bruce Springsteen and the E Street Band, which documented an E Street Band recording session the preceding year.

External links
 
 [ Allmusic info]

Living people
1942 births